Ali Hadi Bara (September 9, 1906 – August 30, 1971) was a Turkish sculptor and one of the first artists of the Republican generation in Turkey.

Biography
Ali Hadi Bara was born in Tehran but moved with his family to the Ottoman Empire when he was young. From 1923 to 1927 he studied at the Fine Arts Academy in Istanbul. Following this he went to Paris and studied sculpture with Henri Bouchard and Charles Despiau. In 1930 he returned to Istanbul and the Fine Arts Academy to become an assistant teacher. He visited Paris between 1949 and 1950, after which he ceased to create figural works and instead turned to creating non-figural sculpture. From 1950 until his death in 1971 he worked at the Academy in Istanbul.

Works
 Adana Monument (1935)
 Monument to Atatürk (1937)
 Statue of 16th-century Ottoman admiral Barbarossa in Beşiktaş, Istanbul. (1946 on 400th anniversary of Barbarossa's death)
 Monument of Atatürk and Ismet Inönü on Horseback in Zonguldak

Exhibitions
 Venice Biennale (1956, 1958)
 São Paulo Biennial (1957, 1961)
 Exposition Internationale de Sculpture Contemporaine at the Musée Rodin, Paris (1961)
 Turkish High Sculptors Society exhibition at the Taksim Art Gallery (1973)

References

Bibliography and external links
D. Erbil: ‘The Development of Turkish Sculpture of the Republican Period’, The Transformation of Turkish Culture: The Atatürk Legacy, ed. G. Renda and C. M. Kortepeter (Princeton, 1986), pp. 131–44
 Consulate General Republic of Turkey: Sculpture

1906 births
1971 deaths
Turkish male sculptors
Iranian emigrants to the Ottoman Empire
Turkish expatriates in France
People from Tehran